The Cimitero Evangelico agli Allori ("The Evangelical Cemetery at Laurels") is located in Florence, Italy, between 'Due Strade' and Galluzzo.

History
The small cemetery was opened in 1877 when the non-Catholic communities of Florence could no longer bury their dead in the English Cemetery in Piazzale Donatello. It is named after the Allori farm where it was located.

Born as a Protestant cemetery, it is now nonsectarian and hosts people of all Christian denominations, as well as other religions (including Jews and Muslims) and non-believers.

The cemetery became newsworthy in 2006 when the writer and journalist Oriana Fallaci was buried there alongside her family. A stone memorial to Alexandros Panagoulis, her companion, is also present.

Notable burials
 Harold Acton – British writer, Lot: LOG-I-43
 William Acton – British painter, Lot: LOG-I-43
 Gisela von Arnim Grimm — German fabulist and writer
 Thomas Ball – American Sculptor, worked with Hiram Powers and William Couper
 Arnold Böcklin – Swiss painter, Lot: A-VII-2
 Elizabeth Boott – Frank Duveneck's wife, Lot: R-III-27
 Oriana Fallaci – Italian writer, Lot: I-XV-10
 Corrado Feroci (Silpa Bhirasri) – Italian sculptor, Lot: C-II-9
 Larkin Goldsmith Mead – American sculptor, Lot: H-VI-11
 John Pope-Hennessy – British art historian, Lot: T/A-I-13
 John Louis Herbert Hinkler – Australian aviator, Lot: Q-I-23
 Herbert Percy Horne – British art collector, Lot: E-V-25
 Alice Keppel – British mistress of Edward VII
 Emily Hoggins Kossuth – Ferenc Kossuth's wife, Lot: A-VIII-1
 Violet Page (Vernon Lee) – British writer
 Charles Loeser – Art historian, Lot: A-X-23
 Roberto Longhi – Italian art historian, Lot: N-II-9
 Tjaarke Maas – Dutch artist
 Vasco Magrini – Italian aviator, Lot: A-VIII-13
 Teodorico Pietrocola Rossetti – Italian poet, Lot: A-II-4
 Leonardo Savioli – Italian architect, Lot: K-III-21
 Truman Seymour – American Civil War General and watercolor artist
 Osbert Sitwell – British writer
 Hans-Joachim Staude – German painter, Lot: I-XI-27
 Eggert Stefánsson (1890–1962) – Icelandic Writer and Singer
 Frederick Stibbert – Italian British art collector, A-X-25
 Ernesto Michahelles (Thayaht) – Italian artist, Lot: E-V-22
 Violet Trefusis – English and French writer, Lot: I-VIII-44
 Reginald Turner (writer) – British writer and friend of Oscar Wilde
 Mary Rogers Williams – American artist

Gallery

See also
 English Cemetery, Florence

Further reading

External links

 Il registro delle persone sepolte agli Allori e al Cimitero degli Inglesi di Firenze
 

Cemeteries in Florence
1860 establishments in Italy